This is a List of National Historic Landmarks in Mississippi.  It includes current National Historic Landmarks (NHLs), and also National Park Service areas in Mississippi that overlap.

National Historic Landmarks in Mississippi

There are 40 National Historic Landmarks in Mississippi. Five of these are also State Historic Sites. For consistency, the sites are named here as designated under the National Historic Landmark program. A cross-reference list of all seven State Historic Sites is provided further below, which uses different names for some sites. The NHLs are concentrated in 17 of Mississippi's 82 counties. Thirteen are in Adams County alone.

|}

Former NHLs in Mississippi

There have been no de-designations of Mississippi NHLs, but one NHL object has been moved out of the state and was subsequently delisted:

National Park Service areas in Mississippi
National Historic Parks, National Battlefields, and certain other areas listed in the National Park system are historic landmarks of national importance that are highly protected already, often before the inauguration of the NHL program in 1960, and are then often not also named NHLs per se.  There are five of these in Mississippi.  The National Park Service lists these five together with the NHLs in the state. They are:

See also
National Register of Historic Places listings in Mississippi
List of National Historic Landmarks by state

References

External links

National Historic Landmarks Program, at National Park Service
National Park Service listings of National Historic Landmarks

Mississippi
 
National Historic Landmarks
National Historic Landmarks